My Very Last Breath is the eighth installment in The Emo Diaries series of compilation albums, released July 23, 2002 by Deep Elm Records. As with all installments in the series, the label had an open submissions policy for bands to submit material for the compilation, and as a result the music does not all fit within the emo style. As with the rest of the series, My Very Last Breath features mostly unsigned bands contributing songs that were previously unreleased.

Reception

Reviewer Johnny Loftus of Allmusic remarks that the album "features some of the most melodic and tightly arranged material that the series has seen":

That is the thing about the Emo Diaries, you always have a pretty good idea about what each new page will bring, but that doesn't make it any less exciting to read. There are a few spots that some might view as experimentation overtaking good sense (the sax solo in the Colour Blue's "Of Our Disregard"), but overall, My Very Last Breath proves that the Emo Diaries series just keeps getting stronger.

Track listing

References

External links 
 My Very Last Breath at Deep Elm Records.

2002 compilation albums
Deep Elm Records compilation albums
Emo compilation albums
Indie rock compilation albums